Busick is a populated place in Yancey County, North Carolina, United States.

Geography
Busick is located in Still Fork Creek valley along North Carolina Highway 80 approximately one mile west of the Blue Ridge Parkway. The South Toe River flows past about one mile to the west.

References

Unincorporated communities in Yancey County, North Carolina
Unincorporated communities in North Carolina